Stephen D. Gutierrez (born Montebello, California) is an American short story writer, professor at California State University, East Bay, and winner of a 2010 American Book Award. He won the 2010 Maxim Mazumdar New Play Competition.

He graduated from California State University, Chico with a BA in English in 1981, and from Cornell University with an MFA in 1987. He is married to the writer Jacqueline Doyle; they have one son.

Works
"From the book Live From Fresno y Los", Poets & Writers
"MARCELLA'S ACT", LITnIMAGE

Live from Fresno y Los: stories, Bear Star Press, 2009,

Plays
Game Day
The Performance, San Francisco Theatre Festival

Anthologies
Latinos in Lotus Land:  An Anthology of Contemporary Southern California Literature.

References

External links
Author's website
"INTERVIEW WITH STEPHEN D. GUTIERREZ", La Bloga, May 18, 2009

Living people
California State University, East Bay faculty
American short story writers
People from Montebello, California
Writers from the San Francisco Bay Area
American Book Award winners
Year of birth missing (living people)